Long View is a town in Burke and Catawba counties in the U.S. state of North Carolina. The population was 4,871 at the 2010 census. It is part of the Hickory–Lenoir–Morganton Metropolitan Statistical Area.

History

Originally known as "Penelope," Long View incorporated in 1907.

Geography
Long View is located in western Catawba County and eastern Burke County at  (35.726132, -81.383811). It is bordered to the north and east by the city of Hickory, to the west by the town of Hildebran, and to the south by the census-designated place of Mountain View.

U.S. Route 70 passes through Long View, leading east into Hickory and west  to Morganton. Interstate 40 crosses the southern part of Long View, with access from Exit 121 (Old Shelby Road/33rd Street).

Demographics

2020 census

As of the 2020 United States census, there were 5,088 people, 2,182 households, and 1,267 families residing in the town.

2010 census
As of the census of 2010, there were 4,871 people, 2,067 households, and 1,272 families residing in the town. The population density was 1,237 people per square mile (477.7/km2). There were 2,315 housing units at an average density of 587.6/sq mi (227.0/km2). The racial makeup of the town was 74.5% White, 11.4% African American, 0.4% Native American, 5.0% Asian, 5.7% some other race, and 3.0% from two or more races. Hispanic or Latino of any race were 10.6% of the population.

There were 2,067 households, out of which 28.8% had children under the age of 18 living with them, 39.3% were headed by married couples living together, 15.4% had a female householder with no husband present, and 38.5% were non-families. 32.1% of all households were made up of individuals, and 12.9% were someone living alone who was 65 years of age or older. The average household size was 2.36 and the average family size was 2.95.

In the town, the population was spread out, with 22.3% under the age of 18, 9.1% from 18 to 24, 27.3% from 25 to 44, 25.5% from 45 to 64, and 15.8% who were 65 years of age or older. The median age was 38.8 years. For every 100 females, there were 96.6 males. For every 100 females age 18 and over, there were 94.2 males.

For the period 2008–12, the estimated median annual income for a household in the town was $31,015, and the median income for a family was $39,281. Male full-time workers had a median income of $30,054 versus $25,989 for females. The per capita income for the town was $16,547. About 13.5% of families and 20.6% of the population were below the poverty line, including 37.7% of those under age 18 and 7.5% of those age 65 or over.

References

External links

 Town website

Towns in Catawba County, North Carolina
Towns in Burke County, North Carolina